Geoffrey Fantham Sim  (2 April 1911 – 27 March 2002) was a New Zealand politician of the National Party.

Biography

Sim was born at Ngatapa near Gisborne in 1911. He received his education at Morrinsville, Pukekohe High School, and King's College. At the latter school, he was a lightweight boxing champion. After school, he was a farmer at Waimārama, was involved in felling bush, was a driver in the Onewhero and Thames region, became head shepherd at Crossland Station near Kaipara Harbour, before working as a stock agent in Waiuku.

In World War II, he served in the Middle East. At Sidi Rezegh, he lost an eye, an arm, and the use of one leg. While he was in hospital, he became a prisoner of war.

He returned to New Zealand in 1943. He held Waikato until 1963, when that electorate was also abolished. From 1958 to 1960 he was Shadow Minister of Maori Affairs while National was in opposition.

He was appointed a Companion of the Queen's Service Order for public services in the 1978 New Year Honours.

Sim died in 2002.

Notes

References

|-

|-

1911 births
2002 deaths
New Zealand National Party MPs
People educated at King's College, Auckland
New Zealand MPs for North Island electorates
Members of the New Zealand House of Representatives
Companions of the Queen's Service Order
New Zealand military personnel of World War II
New Zealand prisoners of war in World War II
20th-century New Zealand politicians
People educated at Pukekohe High School
New Zealand politicians with disabilities